The Mid Tipperary Senior Hurling Championship (known for sponsorship reasons as the Centenary Agri Mid Tipperary Senior Hurling Championship) is an annual hurling competition organised by the Mid Tipperary Board of the Gaelic Athletic Association since 1907 for senior hurling teams in Mid Tipperary, Ireland.

The series of games begin in April, with the championship culminating with the final in August. The championship has always been played using a knock-out format.

The Mid Tipperary Championship was, until recent times, an integral part of the wider Tipperary Senior Hurling Championship. The winners and runners-up of the Mid Tipperary Championship joined their counterparts from the other three divisions to contest the county championship quarter-finals.

Nine clubs currently participate in the Mid Tipperary Championship. The all-time record-holders are Thurles Sarsfields, who have won a total of 45 titles. 

JK Brackens are the current title-holders after defeating Drom-Inch by 0-19 to 1-15 in the 2022 championship final.

The championship

Overview

The Mid Tipperary Championship is a knockout tournament with pairings drawn at random — there are no seeds.

Each match is played as a single leg. If a match ends as a draw there is a period of extra time, followed by a second period of extra time should the teams remain deadlocked. If both sides are still level at the end of extra time a replay takes place and so on until a winner is found.

Roll of honour

Finals

References

Mid Tipperary Senior Hurling Championship